Jalil Abbas Jilani is a Pakistani diplomat who was born on February 3, 1955, in Multan to a family known for high-profile bureaucrats. He served as the 22nd Ambassador of Pakistan to the United States from December 2013 to February 2017, and previously served as the Foreign Secretary of Pakistan from March 2012 to December 2013. He currently serves as a Senior Director at the Centre for Aerospace and Security Studies (CASS).

Early life and education
Jilani was educated as a lawyer at University of Oxford, before joining the Foreign Service of Pakistan in March 1979. He graduated with a Bachelor's degree in Law  and later on an M.Sc  degree in Defense and Strategic Studies. He speaks several languages including French, Arabic, Seraiki, Punjabi and Pushto.

Career
He served as the deputy secretary at Prime Minister's Office between 1989 and 1992, and as the deputy high commissioner to India between 1999 and 2003. He headed the South Asia desk at the Foreign Office between 2003 and 2007, during which time he was also appointed as the Ministry's Spokesman.

In 2007, he was commissioned as Pakistan's High Commissioner to Australia and served until 2009, when he was tasked as Ambassador of Pakistan to European Union based out of Brussels. Jilani was promoted to the highest rank of BPS-22 grade in 2010 and consequently became the country's Foreign Secretary in March 2012, the top civil service official in the Ministry of Foreign Affairs.

References

1955 births
Living people
Ambassadors of Pakistan to the United States
Foreign Secretaries of Pakistan
Alumni of the University of Oxford